This is the order of battle for the Battle of Corunna, 16 January 1809.

French II Corps d'Armée 

Commander-in-chief: Marshal Jean-de-Dieu Soult

Total: between 13,000 and 20,000

British Army 
Commander-in-Chief: Lt Gen Sir John Moore.

After Moore was mortally wounded Lt General Sir David Baird took command until he was wounded at which point Lt Gen the Hon John Hope took command

Total: approx. 15,000

Notes

References

Peninsular War orders of battle
History of A Coruña